Agathiopsis is a genus of moths in the family Geometridae. The species of this genus are found in Australia and Papua New Guinea.

Species
 Agathiopsis basipuncta Warren, 1896
 Agathiopsis maculata Warren, 1896
 Agathiopsis subflavata Warren, 1905

References

External links

 

Geometrinae
Geometridae genera